Hyposmocoma trimelanota is a species of moth of the family Cosmopterigidae. It was first described by Edward Meyrick in 1935. It is endemic to the island of Hawaii. The type locality is Kīlauea.

External links

trimelanota
Endemic moths of Hawaii
Moths described in 1935
Taxa named by Edward Meyrick